William Mitchell Rodman (June 19, 1814 – December 11, 1868) was a tailor and 7th mayor of Providence, Rhode Island from 1857 to 1859.

Early life
Rodman was born June 19, 1814, in Newport, Rhode Island. Young William attended the school taught by his father, a Quaker school-master. At age 16, he moved to Providence to become a tailor's apprentice with the firm E.C. & T. Wells.

Career
Wells were the leading tailors of Providence. Starting from about 1850, Rodman teamed with Sullivan Moulton to form the tailoring firm of Moulton and Rodman, located first in the Arcade, then at 27 Westminster Street. Their customers included some of the most prominent people of Providence.

Rodman was a member of the school committee and City Council before being elected to two consecutive terms as mayor from 1857 to 1859. After his political career, Rodman went into the insurance business.

Rodman died at his home in Providence on December 11, 1868 and was buried at Swan Point Cemetery.

References

External links
 William M. Rodman at Providence City website

Mayors of Providence, Rhode Island
1814 births
1868 deaths
Politicians from Newport, Rhode Island
American tailors
Burials at Swan Point Cemetery
School board members in Rhode Island
Providence City Council members
19th-century American politicians